Then Play On is the third studio album by the British blues rock band Fleetwood Mac, released on 19 September 1969. It was the first of their original albums to feature Danny Kirwan (although he is also listed on two tracks on the earlier compilation The Pious Bird of Good Omen) and the last with Peter Green. Jeremy Spencer did not feature on the album apart from "a couple of piano things" (according to Mick Fleetwood in Q magazine in 1990). The album offered a broader stylistic range than the straightforward electric blues of the group's first two albums, displaying elements of folk rock, hard rock, art rock and psychedelia. The album reached No. 6 on the UK Albums Chart, becoming the band's fourth Top 20 LP in a row, as well as their third album to reach the Top 10. The album's title, Then Play On, is taken from the opening line of William Shakespeare's play Twelfth Night—"If music be the food of love, play on".

Then Play On is Fleetwood Mac's first release with Reprise Records after being lured away from Blue Horizon and a one-off with Immediate Records. The label would be the band's home until their self-titled 1975 album. The initial US release of the album omitted two tracks that were previously issued on the American compilation English Rose, while the second US pressing further abridged the tracklist with the addition of the hit single "Oh Well". The original CD compiled all the songs from the two US LP versions, both of which omitted the "English Rose" tracks that are on the original UK version. In August 2013, a remastered edition of the album was reissued on vinyl and CD, restoring its original 1969 UK track listing and adding four bonus tracks from the same era.

Background
Fleetwood Mac's previous albums had been recorded live in the studio and adhered strictly to the blues formula. For the recording of Then Play On, editing and overdubbing techniques were used extensively for the first time.
Green had recently introduced improvisation and jamming to the band's live performances and three of the tracks on the album including "Underway", "Searching for Madge", and "Fighting for Madge", which were compiled by Green from several hours of studio jam sessions. 

Green, the de facto band leader at the time, delegated half of the songwriting to bandmate Danny Kirwan so he could sing more lead vocals. Music journalist Anthony Bozza remarked that Green “was a very generous band leader in every single way. And Peter gave Danny all of that freedom. You just don’t hear about things like that.” Jeremy Spencer, the band's other guitarist, did not play on any of the album's original tracks. Green and Spencer had planned to record a concept album — “an orchestral-choral LP” — about the life of Jesus Christ, although the album never came to fruition. Instead, Spencer released a solo album in 1970 with the members of Fleetwood Mac as his backing band.

Although "Oh Well" was a hit in the UK, it was not the group's first single released in America. Instead, Clifford Davis, who was Fleetwood Mac's manager at the time, selected "Rattlesnake Shake" to be released in the US. While Davis thought "Rattlesnake Shake" would become a big hit, it failed to chart anywhere. After the failure of "Rattlesnake Shake", "Oh Well" was chosen as the second single for the US market. The second single fared much better, becoming the band's first song to chart on the Billboard Hot 100.

Artwork
The painting used for the album cover artwork is a mural by the English artist Maxwell Armfield. The painting was featured in the February 1917 edition of The Countryside magazine, which noted that the mural was originally designed for the dining room of a London mansion.

Reception
Contemporary reception of the album was mixed. Writing for Rolling Stone magazine, John Morthland said Fleetwood Mac had fallen "flat on their faces", and later dismissed the album as mostly "nondescript ramblings". On the other hand, Robert Christgau was more positive. He described the album's mixing of "easy ballads and Latin rhythms with the hard stuff" as "odd" but "very good".
 
However, more recent reviews of the album are highly positive; The New Rolling Stone Album Guide labeling the album as a "cool, blues-based stew" and considered it the second best Fleetwood Mac album. The Telegraph described Then Play On as a "musically expansive, soft edged, psychedelic blues odyssey". Clark Collins of Blender magazine gave the album five stars out of five, and described "Oh Well" as an "epic blues-pop workout".

Track listing

Original UK LP, September 1969

Note
"When You Say" was covered by Christine McVie on her 1970 eponymous album.

Original US LP, September 1969
The two songs ("One Sunny Day" & "Without You") deleted from the US version of the LP had already appeared on the US compilation English Rose, and "Underway" was shortened by about 15 seconds.

Revised US LP, November 1969
When the double-sided single "Oh Well (Parts 1 & 2)" (released November 1969) became a hit, the US LP was re-released in a revised running order to include "Oh Well", dropping Danny Kirwan's "When You Say" and "My Dream" to make room for it. The two parts of "Oh Well" differ widely, the first being hard rock, the latter a meditative instrumental, on which Green played cello. The first minute or so of "Part 2" was included as a fade-out coda to the A-side of the single. For the album, "Oh Well (Parts 1 & 2)" were crudely spliced together, so that the coda is heard twice. Without the repeat, the whole piece runs only 7:58. "Part 1" of "Oh Well" has remained a regular concert feature to the present day, sung variously by Bob Welch, Lindsey Buckingham, Billy Burnette and Mike Campbell.

Other changes include putting the two edits from the "Madge" jams back-to-back, fading down between them. The giggle that previously linked "My Dream" to "Like Crying" ended up, in the previous edit, following the end of "Fighting for Madge" instead. Madge, the press were told at the time, was a female fan of the group, immortalised in two long instrumental jams finally released in their entirety on 2002's The Vaudeville Years. A revised UK version with the same 11 tracks in the same order as the revised US LP, was issued in the UK with a plain black cover (Reprise K44103), though confusingly it was printed with the wrong track listing on both the cover and on the vinyl's centre labels. The track listing, as printed, was the original UK 14 tracks.

Original CD, 1990
The CD release mostly sticks to the order of the revised US track listing, but re-inserts the two deleted songs ("My Dream" and "When You Say") in new locations. The giggle is now tied to the end of "Fighting For Madge" instead of the beginning of "Like Crying" by the previous edit. "Oh Well" still contains the repeated minute. The two songs that appeared only on the UK LP are still missing.

Rhino Records Deluxe Edition CD/LP 2013
In August 2013, Rhino Records reissued a Deluxe Edition remastered edition of the album on vinyl and CD, restoring its original 1969 UK track listing and adding four bonus tracks from the same era.

Unreleased Bonus EP: The Milton Schlitz Show
The original intention was to include a bonus EP in the Then Play On album. The EP was to be compensation for the fact that Jeremy Spencer barely appeared on the album. The EP consisted of Spencer's parodies of doo wop ("Ricky Dee and the Angels"), Alexis Korner, country blues ("Texas Slim"), acid rock ("The Orange Electric Squares"), and John Mayall. It was finally released on Fleetwood Mac's The Vaudeville Years compilation in the 1990s.

Personnel
Fleetwood Mac
Peter Green – vocals, guitar, harmonica, six string bass, percussion, cello on "Oh Well (Part 2)"
Danny Kirwan – vocals, guitar
John McVie – bass guitar
Mick Fleetwood – drums, percussion
Jeremy Spencer – piano on "Oh Well (Part 2)"

Additional personnel
Christine Perfect – piano - uncredited
Sandra Elsdon – recorders on "Oh Well (Part 2)"

Production
Fleetwood Mac – producers
Martin Birch – engineer
Dinky Dawson – sound consultant

Charts

References

Fleetwood Mac albums
1969 albums
Reprise Records albums
Albums produced by Peter Green (musician)
Albums produced by John McVie
Albums produced by Mick Fleetwood
Albums produced by Danny Kirwan